The ACC Under-19 Asia Cup is a cricket tournament organised by the ACC for Under-19 teams from its member nations. It was first held in 1989 in Bangladesh where India won the tournament. The second edition was played after 14 years in 2003 in Pakistan where India retained their title. In the group stages of 2003 edition, Irfan Pathan claimed 9/16 against Bangladesh. The 3rd edition was played in Malaysia in 2012 where the trophy was shared by India and Pakistan after the final was tied. The fourth edition was held in 2013/14 in UAE which was won by India. The fifth edition was held in Sri Lanka in December 2016 and was won by India too. The sixth edition was held in November 2017 in Malaysia, which was won by Afghanistan by 185 run from Pakistan. The seventh edition was held in September & October 2018 in Bangladesh, which was won by India by 144 run from Sri Lanka. The eight edition was held in September 2019 in Sri Lanka & India retained their title. The ninth edition had taken place in December 2021 in United Arab Emirates.

The second tier event, called Youth Asia Cup, was held in Hong Kong in 1997 and every second year since then. It was renamed as ACC Under-19 Elite Cup in 2007. Nepal has been the most successful team in the Elite Cup, having won the tournament four times. The third tier of the tournament is called ACC Under-19 Challenge Cup and was first held in 2008 in Thailand.

Under-19 World Cup qualification history

ACC Under-19 Elite Cup
One of the major roles of the ACC Under-19 Elite Cup has been to provide member nations of the ACC with the chance to qualify for the Under-19 World Cup. It was originally known as the Youth Asia Cup and, for the first two tournaments, two teams qualified directly. During these years, teams from the EAP region took part as did Bangladesh who did not receive full member status until 2000.

After Bangladesh and the EAP sides left the competition the number of qualifying teams was reduced to one and remained this way until the 2007 competition. Following this tournament, the ACC decided to split the teams into two divisions after the model of the men's ACC Trophy. The top division, the Elite Cup, continues to be held in two-year intervals from the initial tournament. The lower division, the Challenge Cup, generally takes place in the year between Elite tournaments although the most recent edition took place in 2013 in Thailand. The winners of this tournament were Singapore.

Tournament results

ACC Under-19 Asia Cup

ACC Under-19 Premier League

ACC Under-19 Elite Cup

ICC U19 Cricket World Cup Asia Qualifier Division 2

ACC Under-19 Challenge Cup

Performance of teams

Records
Only records for topflight ACC under-19 competitions are included. Scorecards for some matches at the 1999 Youth Asia Cup are unavailable.
Highest team scores
421/7 (50 overs) –  v. , 6 May 2013, at Kinrara Academy Oval, Kuala Lumpur.
391/4 (50 overs) –  v. , 14 July 2003, at National Stadium, Pakistan.
391/4 (50 overs) –  v. , 2 February 2011, at Terdthai Cricket Ground, Bangkok.
389/7 (50 overs) –  v. , 10 November 2014, at Sulabiya Ground, Kuwait City.
383/4 (50 overs) –  v. , 13 November 2005, at Pulchowk Engineering Campus Ground, Lalitpur.

Lowest team scores
21 (15.2 overs) –  v.  Nepal, 9 November 2005, at Army School Ground, Bhaktapur.
26 (21.4 overs) –  v. , 6 May 2013, at Kinrara Academy Oval, Kuala Lumpur.
34 (19.2 overs) –  v. , 13 November 2005, at Pulchowk Engineering Campus Ground, Lalitpur.
39 (14.5 overs) –  v. , 9 November 2005, at Tudikhel Ground, Kathmandu.
39 (25.1 overs) –  v. , 14 November 2014, at Sulabiya Ground, Kuwait City.
39 (27.2 overs) –  v. , 5 February 2011, at Terdthai Cricket Ground, Bangkok.

Highest individual scores
200* (140 balls) –  Gayan de Silva, v. , 13 November 2005, at Pulchok Engineering Campus Ground, Lalitpur.
168* (140 balls) – Oman Adnan Ilyas, v. , 15 July 2003, at National Stadium, Karachi.
165 (? balls) –  Philip Parker, v. , 30 November 1997, at Diocesan Boys' School, Hong Kong.
160* (119 balls) –  Tariq Stanikzai, v. , 10 November 2014, at Sulabiya Ground, Kuwait City.
158 (? balls) –  Philip Parker, v. , 30 November 1997, at Tin Kwong Road, Hong Kong.

Best bowling figures
8/12 (10 overs) –  Aftab Alam, v. , 3 February 2011, at Gymkhana Club Ground, Chiang Mai.
8/14 (10 overs) – Hong Kong Mohammad Ghazanfar, v. , 3 May 2013, at Kelab Aman, Kuala Lumpur.
8/15 (6.5 overs) –  Rahul Vishvakarma, v. , 5 February 2011, at AIT Ground, Bangkok.
8/15 (9.2 overs) –  Salman Sattar, v. , 13 November 2005, at Pulchowk Engineering Campus Ground, Lalitpur.
8/24 (8 overs) –  Avinash Karn, v. , 6 May 2013, at Bayuemas Oval, Kuala Lumpur.

Highest margin of defeat by Runs

395 –v.  v , 6 May 2013, at Kinrara Academy Oval, Kuala Lumpur

Highest margin of defeat by wickets

10 wickets –  v. , final of 2013

See also

ACC Trophy

References
2021 ACC U19 Asia Cup Schedule Announced 

Under-19 regional cricket tournaments